Selca is a municipality on the island of Brač in Croatia in the Split-Dalmatia County. It has a population of 1,804 (2011 census), 97.17% of which are Croats. Towns included in the municipality are: Selca, Sumartin, Povlja, Novo Selo which are home to numerous historical sites of various importance such as the Parish Church in Selca, which later came to be known as the "Cathedral of Brač", the 18th century church in Povlja, where the Charter of Povlja was found as well as the 10th century Church of Nikola located in Sumartin.

Geography 
Selca is located on the hills of Pliša, on the east side of the Island of Brač.

Demographics 
The town of Selca has a population of about a thousand people. According to the 2011 census, the whole municipality of Selca has a population of 1'804, the majority of which are Croats that make up 97.17%. The most practiced religion is Catholicism.

History 
Selca is first mentioned in the Charter of Povlja in 1184.

As an agricultural settlement, Selca began its existence as a small part of the parish (the smallest administrative unit within the Christian Church) of Gornji Humac. Thanks to stone masonry the settlement later began to evolve rapidly, which then led to an administrative reorganisation that made Selca its own parish in 1815. Local demographics statistics show a boom in the numbers of inhabitants, going from a population of 124 in 1678 to a population of 400 in 1763. The small church which could take only 20 people was then expanded, as did the village itself with newly built houses and administrative establishments. The town slowly took the form of a well-established economic center on the east side of the Island of Brač. The first school on said side of the Island then opened its doors in 1859.

In 1943, shortly before the capitulation of Fascist Italy, the Italian army had burned large parts of Selca down, along with 6 other settlements on the Island of Brač, an event that left visible traces to this day. The manifestation was named Croatia rediviva: Ča, Kaj, Što - baštinski dani, organized in 2008, commemorates the day of the attack. The festival is held annually, and every poet reads his own verses, in one of the three Croatian literary idioms, at the main stone-covered square of Stjepan Radić in front of numerous interested admirers of the Croatian literary word.

Notable people 
 Celestin Bezmalinović (1912–93), bishop
 Niko Bezmalinović, Croatian economist and diplomat
 Nikola Bezmalinović (Nick Bez), Croatian industrialist in the USA and American politician
 Marija Brida (1912–93), freedom philosopher
 Niko Carević, Croatian medic
  Tomo Didolić (1844–1907), first mayor of the municipality of Selca
 Helena Gamulin-Brida, Croatian Sea Biologist
 Zlatan Jakšić (1924–2007), professor at the philosopher's university in Zadar, one of the biggest čakavian philosophers
 Neva Kežić (1948–2010), Croatian poet who writes mainly in the Čakavian dialect
 Ante Nižetić (1924–2007), Croatian poet
 Siniša Vuković (born 1973), Croatian linguist, writer and dirigent
 Andro Štambuk (1913–55), auxiliary Bishop, who took care of refugees, was a victim of the post-communist violence due to his religious beliefs
 Davor Štambuk, Croatian caricaturist
 Drago Štambuk (born 1950), medic, writer, essayist and diplomat; author and promoter of "zlatne formule hrvatskoga jezika ča-kaj-što" (The golden formula of the Croatian language ča-kaj-što); Founder of the pan-Croatian writers event "Croatia rediviva ča-kaj-što" 1991.
 Ivan Štambuk (called "Ivulić") (1911–71), philanthropist, the youngest mayor (1939–1943), initiator of the rehabilitation of the then burned town of Selca
 Nives Štambuk Giljanović (1947), expert on the water systems of the Dalmatia region, scientist and medical professor at the medical university of Split, writer of the books "Vode Dalmacije" (Water of Dalmatia), Vode Cetine (Water of Cetine), Vode Neretve (Water of Neretva)
 Slavko Štambuk, prebendary, writer of the parish chronicles, played a great role in the building of the "Brač cathedral"
 Slobodan Štambuk (born 1941), bishop
 Vjenceslav Štambuk, businessman, founder of the first Dalmatian cooperative, dedicated his life for the building of the "Brač cathedral"
 Andro Ursić, priest

Monuments 

Selca, throughout Croatia, is known for their monuments dedicated to important historical figures and has the biggest amount of monuments per Capita. Notable examples include:
 A statue dedicated to the Russian writer Leo Tolstoy, which was the first statue dedicated to this writer, since it was put in place shortly after Tolstoy's death.
 "Park zahvalnosti" (Park of Gratitude) is a park dedicated to three historical figures that played a big part in the independence of Croatia 1991. The park is home to three statues; That of Franjo Tuđman, the first president of the modern Croatian state, Hansa Dietrich Genscher, German politician and German unison architect, one of the first high-ranked politicians to recognize Croatia and Alois Mock, Austrian politician who dedicated himself for Croatia to be recognized internationally.
 A stone plate dedicated to Martin Kukučín (Real name Matej Bencúr), who spent a big part of his life in Selca, married to Perica Didolić, worked as a medic in Selca and is considered one of the founders of modern Slovak prose.
 A bronze statue on the main square of the town dedicated to Stjepan Radić, who was an important Croatian politician, playing a big role in returning the Croatian spirit as a force in the then Kingdom of SHS. Due to a conflict of interest, he was shot by a member of the Serbian people's radical party in 1928.
 A statue dedicated to Pope John Paul II.
 In the apse of the church, there's a bronze statue symbolising the heart of Jesus, which was then made from molten leftover bullets from World War II.

Education 

The elementary school in Selca was founded in 1859, a few decades after the first population boom. It educates students from the whole municipality of Selca from the first to eight class and due to a vastly declining population during World War II which made the elementary school in Povlja obsolete, remained the only elementary school in the municipality. The school building has its own sports hall and during the warm weather it uses the grass field in front of it as well as the football / futsal field of the local football club "Takmac" Selca. Currently, the following subjects are taught:

 Croatian language
 Mathematics
 Chemistry
 Physics
 Sports education
 English language
 History
 Biology
 Religion

Culture 

The "Hrvatski sastanak" society (Croatian meeting society) was founded in Selca in 1888, which was active until the beginning of the second half of the 20th century. It was then revitalized in 1988 on the 100 anniversary since it has been founded and now bears the official name Hrvatski sastanak 1888". The society was brought back to life by Sinaj Bulimbašić who was the chairman for most of its modern existence. He was then replaced by Juro Štambuk "Čiča" and today is led by the municipality's mayor Ivan Marijančević. Under its banner are the male Klapa "Selca" and the female "Fjorin" and "Mirula" as well as a Mandolin orchestra. With the reneval of "Hrvatski Sastanak 1888" also came the establishment of Selca's brass band, whose chairman is former mayor Bruno Štambuk.

As part of the parish organisation, the assembly of Krista kralja (King Christ), whose establisher is named Siniša Vuković made itself known throughout Croatia as well as Italy, France, Austria, Poland, Slovakia, Hungary for their religious songs. They recorded a complete selection of their songs on various media "Ispovid'te se" (Repent) which in 2008 was produced by the Split-based record label "Verbum". The organ player on that selection was local musician Pero Bošković.

In 1991 the writer, medic and diplomat Dr. Drago Štambuk founded the Pan-Croatian writers manifestation "Croatia rediviva" which promotes all three main Croatian dialects: Chakavian, Kajkavian and Shtokavian. The manifestation is held annually in Summer on the main square of Selca, attracting many locals and tourists alike and had some well-established writers participating such as Dragutin Tadijanović, Vesna Parun, Slavko Mihalić, Tonko Maroević, Luko Pateljak, Jakša Fiamengo and Joško Božanić. After the poetry marathon the founder crowns one poet with an olive wreath, who then becomes "Poeta oliveatus". A small text from said winner is then chosen which will be cut in a stone plate and hung on the iconic "Zid od poezije" (Wall of poetry), also located on the main square.

There is also a drama group named "Mirina" that base their play on events that occurred in the municipality itself, bringing humor to otherwise frustrating events, sometimes in a manner of light-hearted Schadenfreude. During the same period of Spring the Selca carnival takes place which offers its visitors a corso of modified vehicles and a costume ball.

Sports 

The most notable sports organisation is the local football / futsal club "Takmac", its organisation taking care of numerous sports events in the municipality since a few decades.

Sports summer events
In 2013 with the help of the municipality and the mayor, Ivan Marijančević, an annual event was started under the name of "Sportsko Lito Selca" (Sports summer Selca) with the goal to promote sports in the municipality. It ended up growing bigger than its original purpose and became a major event for locals and tourists alike, bringing sport enthusiasts from all parts of the Island of Brač together and compete in all the popular sports on said island which include: football, basketball, cageball, tennis, table tennis, and boccia. The sports event are also accompanied by numerous special events such as the "Old vs. young" football match on the large field, concerts that hosted well known bands and a Football Ultras manifestation lighting flares and various other fireworks called "Pyroshow".

The events take its financial resources from the municipality and local companies that have decided to sponsor the event.

Literature 

 Brački zbornik br. 6, Dasen Vrsalović-Povijest otoka Brača, Skupština općine Brač, Supetar 1968.

References

External links 

Populated places in Split-Dalmatia County
Brač